The 2020–21 Toronto Maple Leafs season was the 104th season for the National Hockey League franchise that was established on November 22, 1917.

Due to the Canada–U.S. border restrictions brought in as a result of the COVID-19 pandemic, the Maple Leafs were re-aligned with the other six Canadian franchises into the newly-formed North Division. The league's 56 game season was played entirely within the new divisions, meaning that Toronto and the other Canadian teams played an all-Canadian schedule for the 2020–21 regular season as well as the first two rounds of the 2021 Stanley Cup playoffs.

The team saw tremendous success during the course of the regular season, clinching a playoff birth on April 28 after a 4–1 win against the Montreal Canadiens, one of the first teams in the league to do so. Then on May 8, again versus Montreal, they clinched the North Division with a 3–2 win, which was their first division championship since 2000. Auston Matthews recorded a league high 41 goals, becoming the first player in team history to win the Maurice "Rocket" Richard Trophy, and was also named a finalist for the Ted Lindsay Award, given to the league's most outstanding player as voted on by players. Additionally, Mitch Marner and Matthews both finished top five in league scoring (placing fourth and fifth, respectively). The team however disappointed in the playoffs; after going up 3–1 in their First Round series against the Montreal Canadiens, Toronto was defeated in seven games. It was the fifth consecutive year that the Maple Leafs lost in the opening round of the postseason and the fourth consecutive year they were eliminated in the final, winner-take-all game.

Standings

Divisional standings

Record vs opponents

Notes
 Game decided in overtime
 Game decided in a shootout

Schedule and results

Regular season

|- style="background:#cfc;"
| 1 || January 13 || Montreal Canadiens || 5–4 || OT || Andersen (1–0–0) || Scotiabank Arena || 0 || 1–0–0 || 2 || 
|- style="background:#fcc;"
| 2 || January 15 || @ Ottawa Senators || 3–5 ||  || Andersen (1–1–0) || Canadian Tire Centre || 0 || 1–1–0 || 2 || 
|- style="background:#cfc;"
| 3 || January 16 || @ Ottawa Senators || 3–2 ||  || Campbell (1–0–0) || Canadian Tire Centre || 0 || 2–1–0 || 4 ||  
|- style="background:#cfc;"
| 4 || January 18 || Winnipeg Jets || 3–1 ||  || Andersen (2–1–0) || Scotiabank Arena || 0 || 3–1–0 || 6 || 
|- style="background:#fcc;"
| 5 || January 20 || Edmonton Oilers || 1–3 ||  || Andersen (2–2–0) || Scotiabank Arena || 0 || 3–2–0 || 6 || 
|- style="background:#cfc;"
| 6 || January 22 || Edmonton Oilers || 4–2 ||  || Andersen (3–2–0) || Scotiabank Arena || 0 || 4–2–0 || 8 || 
|- style="background:#cfc;"
| 7 || January 24 || @ Calgary Flames || 3–2 ||  || Campbell (2–0–0) || Scotiabank Saddledome || 0 || 5–2–0 || 10 || 
|- style="background:#cfc;"
| 8 || January 26 || @ Calgary Flames || 4–3 ||  || Andersen (4–2–0) || Scotiabank Saddledome || 0 || 6–2–0 || 12 || 
|- style="background:#cfc;"
| 9 || January 28 || @ Edmonton Oilers || 4–3 ||  || Andersen (5–2–0) || Rogers Place || 0 || 7–2–0 || 14 || 
|- style="background:#ffc;"
| 10 || January 30 || @ Edmonton Oilers || 3–4 || OT || Andersen (5–2–1) || Rogers Place || 0 || 7–2–1 || 15 || 
|-

|- style="background:#cfc;"
| 11 || February 4 || Vancouver Canucks || 7–3 ||  || Andersen (6–2–1) || Scotiabank Arena || 0 || 8–2–1 || 17 || 
|- style="background:#cfc;"
| 12 || February 6 || Vancouver Canucks || 5–1 ||  || Andersen (7–2–1) || Scotiabank Arena || 0 || 9–2–1 || 19 || 
|- style="background:#cfc;"
| 13 || February 8 || Vancouver Canucks || 3–1 ||  || Andersen (8–2–1) || Scotiabank Arena || 0 || 10–2–1 || 21 || 
|- style="background:#cfc;"
| 14 || February 10 || @ Montreal Canadiens || 4–2 ||  || Andersen (9–2–1) || Bell Centre || 0 || 11–2–1 || 23 || 
|- style="background:#fcc;"
| 15 || February 13  || Montreal Canadiens || 1–2 ||  || Andersen (9–3–1) || Scotiabank Arena || 0 || 11–3–1 || 23 || 
|- style="background:#ffc;"
| 16 || February 15 || Ottawa Senators || 5–6 || OT || Andersen (9–3–2) || Scotiabank Arena || 0 || 11–3–2 || 24 || 
|- style="background:#cfc;"
| 17 || February 17  || Ottawa Senators || 2–1 ||  || Andersen (10–3–2) || Scotiabank Arena || 0 || 12–3–2 || 26 || 
|- style="background:#cfc;"
| 18 || February 18 || Ottawa Senators || 7–3 ||  || Hutchinson (1–0–0) || Scotiabank Arena || 0 || 13–3–2 || 28 || 
|- style="background:#cfc;"
| 19 || February 20 || @ Montreal Canadiens || 5–3 ||  || Andersen (11–3–2) || Bell Centre || 0 || 14–3–2 || 30 || 
|- style="background:#fcc;"
| 20 || February 22 || Calgary Flames || 0–3 ||  || Hutchinson (1–1–0) || Scotiabank Arena || 0 || 14–4–2 || 30 || 
|- style="background:#cfc;"
| 21 || February 24 || Calgary Flames || 2–1 || OT || Hutchinson (2–1–0) || Scotiabank Arena || 0 || 15–4–2 || 32 || 
|- style="background:#cfc;"
| 22 || February 27 || @ Edmonton Oilers || 4–0 ||  || Campbell (3–0–0) || Rogers Place || 0 || 16–4–2 || 34 ||   
|-

|- style="background:#cfc;"
| 23 || March 1 || @ Edmonton Oilers || 3–0 ||  || Hutchinson (3–1–0) || Rogers Place || 0 || 17–4–2 || 36 || 
|- style="background:#cfc;"
| 24 || March 3 || @ Edmonton Oilers || 6–1 ||  || Andersen (12–3–2) || Rogers Place || 0 || 18–4–2 || 38 || 
|- style="background:#fcc;"
| 25 || March 4 || @ Vancouver Canucks || 1–3 ||  || Hutchinson (3–2–0) || Rogers Arena || 0 || 18–5–2 || 38 || 
|- style="background:#fcc;"
| 26 || March 6 || @ Vancouver Canucks || 2–4 ||  || Andersen (12–4–2) || Rogers Arena || 0 || 18–6–2 || 38 || 
|- style="background:#fcc;"
| 27 || March 9 || Winnipeg Jets  || 3–4 ||  || Andersen (12–5–2) || Scotiabank Arena || 0 || 18–7–2 || 38 || 
|- style="background:#cfc;"
| 28 || March 11 || Winnipeg Jets || 4–3 || OT || Andersen (13–5–2) || Scotiabank Arena || 0 || 19–7–2 || 40 || 
|- style="background:#fcc;"
| 29 || March 13 || Winnipeg Jets || 2–5 ||  || Andersen (13–6–2) || Scotiabank Arena || 0 || 19–8–2 || 40 || 
|- style="background:#fcc;"
| 30 || March 14 || @ Ottawa Senators || 3–4 ||  || Andersen (13–7–2) || Canadian Tire Centre || 0 || 19–9–2 || 40 || 
|- style="background:#fcc;"
| 31 || March 19  || Calgary Flames || 3–4 ||  || Andersen (13–8–2) || Scotiabank Arena || 0 || 19–10–2 || 40 || 
|- style="background:#cfc;"
| 32 || March 20 || Calgary Flames || 2–0 ||  || Campbell (4–0–0) || Scotiabank Arena || 0 || 20–10–2 || 42 || 
|- style="background:#cfc;"
| 33 || March 25 || @ Ottawa Senators || 3–2 || OT || Campbell (5–0–0) || Canadian Tire Centre || 0 || 21–10–2 || 44 || 
|- style="background:#cfc;"
| 34 || March 27 || Edmonton Oilers || 4–3 || OT || Campbell (6–0–0) || Scotiabank Arena || 0 || 22–10–2 || 46 ||   
|- style="background:#ffc;"
| 35 || March 29  || Edmonton Oilers || 2–3 || OT || Hutchinson (3–2–1) || Scotiabank Arena || 0 || 22–10–3 || 47 || 
|- style="background:#cfc;"
| 36 || March 31 || @ Winnipeg Jets || 3–1 ||  || Campbell (7–0–0) || Bell MTS Place || 0 || 23–10–3 || 49 || 
|-

|- style="background:#cfc;"
| 37 || April 2 || @ Winnipeg Jets || 2–1 || SO || Campbell (8–0–0) || Bell MTS Place || 0 || 24–10–3 || 51 || 
|- style="background:#cfc;"
| 38 || April 4 || @ Calgary Flames || 4–2 ||  || Hutchinson (4–2–1) || Scotiabank Saddledome || 0 || 25–10–3 || 53 || 
|- style="background:#cfc;"
| 39 || April 5 || @ Calgary Flames || 5–3 ||  || Campbell (9–0–0) || Scotiabank Saddledome || 0 || 26–10–3 || 55 || 
|- style="background:#cfc;"
| 40 || April 7 || Montreal Canadiens || 3–2 ||  || Campbell (10–0–0) || Scotiabank Arena || 0 || 27–10–3 || 57 || 
|- style="background:#cfc;"
| 41 || April 10 || Ottawa Senators || 6–5 ||  || Campbell (11–0–0) || Scotiabank Arena || 0 || 28–10–3 || 59 || 
|- style="background:#fcc;"
| 42 || April 12 || @ Montreal Canadiens || 2–4 ||  || Campbell (11–1–0) || Bell Centre || 0 || 28–11–3 || 59 || 
|- style="background:#ffc;"
| 43 || April 13 || Calgary Flames || 2–3 || OT || Rittich (0–0–1) || Scotiabank Arena || 0 || 28–11–4 || 60 || 
|- style="background:#fcc;"
| 44 || April 15 || Winnipeg Jets || 2–5 ||  || Campbell (11–2–0) || Scotiabank Arena || 0 || 28–12–4 || 60 || 
|- style="background:#ccc;"
| — || April 17 || @ Vancouver Canucks || – || colspan="7"|Postponed due to COVID-19. Rescheduled for April 18.
|- style="background:#ffc;"
| 45 || April 18 || @ Vancouver Canucks || 2–3 || OT || Campbell (11–2–1) || Rogers Arena || 0 || 28–12–5 || 61 || 
|- style="background:#fcc;"
| 46 || April 20 || @ Vancouver Canucks || 3–6 ||  || Rittich (0–1–1) || Rogers Arena || 0 || 28–13–5 || 61 || 
|- style="background:#cfc;"
| 47 || April 22 || @ Winnipeg Jets || 5–3 ||  || Campbell (12–2–1) || Bell MTS Place || 0 || 29–13–5 || 63 || 
|- style="background:#cfc;"
| 48 || April 24 || @ Winnipeg Jets || 4–1 ||  || Campbell (13–2–1) || Bell MTS Place || 0 || 30–13–5 || 65 || 
|- style="background:#cfc;"
| 49 || April 28 || @ Montreal Canadiens || 4–1 ||  || Campbell (14–2–1) || Bell Centre || 0 || 31–13–5 || 67 || 
|- style="background:#cfc;"
| 50 || April 29 || Vancouver Canucks || 4–1 ||  || Rittich (1–1–1) || Scotiabank Arena || 0 || 32–13–5 || 69 || 
|-

|- style="background:#cfc;"
| 51 || May 1 || Vancouver Canucks || 5–1 ||  || Campbell (15–2–1) || Scotiabank Arena || 0 || 33–13–5 || 71 || 
|- style="background:#ffc;"
| 52 || May 3 || @ Montreal Canadiens || 2–3 || OT || Campbell (15–2–2) || Bell Centre || 0 || 33–13–6 || 72 || 
|- style="background:#cfc;"
| 53 || May 6 || Montreal Canadiens || 5–2 ||  || Campbell (16–2–2) || Scotiabank Arena || 0 || 34–13–6 || 74 || 
|- style="background:#cfc;"
| 54 || May 8 || Montreal Canadiens || 3–2 ||  || Campbell (17–2–2) || Scotiabank Arena || 0 || 35–13–6 || 76 || 
|- style="background:#ffc;"
| 55 || May 12 || @ Ottawa Senators || 3–4 || OT || Andersen (13–8–3) || Canadian Tire Centre || 0 || 35–13–7 || 77 || 
|- style="background:#fcc;"
| 56 || May 14 || @ Winnipeg Jets || 2–4 ||  || Campbell (17–3–2) || Bell MTS Place || 0 || 35–14–7 || 77 || 
|-

|-
| 2020–21 schedule

Overtime statistics

Playoffs

|- style="background:#fcc;"
| 1 || May 20 || Montreal Canadiens || 1–2 ||  || Campbell (0–1) || Scotiabank Arena || 0 || 0–1 || 
|- style="background:#cfc;"
| 2 || May 22 || Montreal Canadiens || 5–1 ||  || Campbell (1–1) || Scotiabank Arena || 0 || 1–1 || 
|- style="background:#cfc;"
| 3 || May 24 || @ Montreal Canadiens || 2–1 ||  || Campbell (2–1) || Bell Centre || 0 || 2–1 || 
|- style="background:#cfc;"
| 4 || May 25 || @ Montreal Canadiens || 4–0 ||  || Campbell (3–1) || Bell Centre || 0 || 3–1 || 
|- style="background:#fcc;"
| 5 || May 27 || Montreal Canadiens || 3–4 || OT || Campbell (3–2) || Scotiabank Arena || 0 || 3–2 || 
|- style="background:#fcc;"
| 6 || May 29 || @ Montreal Canadiens || 2–3 || OT || Campbell (3–3) || Bell Centre || 2,500 || 3–3 || 
|- style="background:#fcc;"
| 7 || May 31 || Montreal Canadiens || 1–3 ||  || Campbell (3–4) || Scotiabank Arena || — || 3–4 || 
|-

|-
|

Player statistics

Skaters

Goaltenders

(M) Player currently playing for the minor league affiliate Toronto Marlies of the AHL 
(X) Player is no longer with the Maple Leafs organization 
(p) Player previously played with another team in the current season before being acquired by Toronto
Bold/italics denotes franchise record.

Transactions
The Maple Leafs have been involved in the following transactions during the 2020–21 season.

Trades

Free agents signed

Free agents lost

Waivers

Contract terminations

Retirement

Signings

Draft picks

Below are the Toronto Maple Leafs' selections at the 2020 NHL Entry Draft, which was originally scheduled for June 26–27, 2020 at the Bell Center in Montreal, Quebec, but was postponed on March 25, 2020, due to the COVID-19 pandemic. It was held October 6–7, 2020 virtually via Video conference call from the NHL Network studio in Secaucus, New Jersey.

The Leafs held on to three of their own seven picks (rounds 4, 5, 6). In June 2019 they had traded way their first and seventh round picks along with Patrick Marleau to the Carolina Hurricanes mainly to clear cap space. On draft day they exchanged their second round pick for two lower picks from the Ottawa Senators. Their third round pick went to the Colorado Avalanche in July 2019 in the Nazem Kadri for Tyson Barrie and Alexander Kerfoot trade. They acquired an additional nine picks this year through various trades.

Notes:
 The Pittsburgh Penguins' first-round pick went to the Toronto Maple Leafs as the result of a trade on August 25, 2020 that sent Kasperi Kapanen, Pontus Aberg and Jesper Lindgren to Pittsburgh in exchange for Evan Rodrigues, Filip Hallander, David Warsofsky and this pick.
 The New York Islanders' second-round pick went to the Toronto Maple Leafs as the result of a trade on October 7, 2020 that sent a 2020 second-round pick (44th overall) to Ottawa in exchange for a 2020 third-round pick (64th overall) and this pick.
Ottawa previously acquired this pick as the result of a trade on February 24, 2020 that sent Jean-Gabriel Pageau to New York in exchange for a conditional 2020 first-round pick, a conditional third-round pick in 2022 and this pick.
 The Ottawa Senators' third-round pick went to the Toronto Maple Leafs as the result of a trade on October 7, 2020 that sent a 2020 second-round pick (44th overall) to Ottawa in exchange for the Islanders' 2020 second-round pick (59th overall) and this pick.
 The Vegas Golden Knights' fourth-round pick went to the Toronto Maple Leafs as the result of a trade on July 23, 2019 that sent Garret Sparks to Vegas in exchange for David Clarkson and this pick.
 The Toronto Maple Leafs' fifth-round pick was re-acquired as the result of a trade on October 7, 2020 that sent Vegas' fifth-round pick and St. Louis' seventh-round pick both in 2020 (153rd and 212th overall) to Florida in exchange for this pick.
Florida previously acquired this pick as the result of a trade on December 29, 2018 that sent Michael Hutchinson to Toronto in exchange for this pick.
 The Carolina Hurricanes' sixth-round pick went to the Toronto Maple Leafs as the result of a trade on June 22, 2019 that sent Patrick Marleau, a conditional 2020 first-round pick and a 2020 seventh-round pick to Carolina in exchange for this pick.
 The Colorado Avalanche's sixth-round pick went to the Toronto Maple Leafs as the result of a trade on July 1, 2019 that sent Nazem Kadri, Calle Rosen and a 2020 third-round pick to Colorado in exchange for Tyson Barrie, Alexander Kerfoot and this pick.
 The San Jose Sharks' seventh-round pick went to the Toronto Maple Leafs as the result of a trade on February 20, 2018 that sent Eric Fehr to San Jose in exchange for this pick.
 The Winnipeg Jets' seventh-round pick went to the Toronto Maple Leafs as the result of a trade on May 30, 2019 that sent Fedor Gordeev to Minnesota in exchange for this pick (being conditional at the time of the trade). The condition – Toronto will receive Winnipeg's 2020 seventh-round pick if Gordeev signs with the Wild before June 1, 2019 – was converted on May 30, 2019.
Minnesota previously acquired this pick as the result of a trade on February 25, 2019 that sent Matt Hendricks to Winnipeg in exchange for this pick.
 The Boston Bruins' seventh-round pick went to the Toronto Maple Leafs as the result of a trade on October 7, 2020 that sent a seventh-round pick in 2021 to Boston in exchange for this pick.

Notes

References

Toronto Maple Leafs seasons
Maple Leafs
Maple Leafs
Toronto Maple Leafs season
Toronto Maple Leafs season